Bullet to Beijing is a 1995 made-for-television film that continues the adventures of the fictional spy Harry Palmer, who appeared in the 1960s films The Ipcress File, Funeral in Berlin and Billion Dollar Brain, based on books by author Len Deighton. Though an alternative title is Len Deighton's Bullet to Beijing, Deighton was not associated with the film.

The 1996 sequel Midnight in Saint Petersburg was filmed back-to-back with this film.

Plot
Harry Palmer (Michael Caine) is forced into early retirement from MI5. He receives a telephone call offering a mysterious job opportunity.

Harry flies to St. Petersburg, Russia, where he is met by Nikolai (Jason Connery). They are followed and shot at by Chechens, before Nick (as Harry insists on calling him) and Natasha (Mia Sara) can deliver Harry to his potential employer, Alex (Michael Gambon). Alex tells Harry that a deadly binary biological weapon called Alorex has been stolen; he wants Harry to find it. Harry cannot turn down the pay: $250,000.

Louis (John Dunn-Hill), one of his old contacts, tells him that the Alorex will be on a train, the Bullet to Beijing. Ex-KGB Colonel Gradsky (Lev Prygunov) and his men are also passengers, as are Nick, Natasha and Craig Warner (Michael Sarrazin), yet another unemployed spy, this time formerly with the CIA. When Harry and Nick try to find out what is in the crate Gradsky is transporting to the North Korean embassy, Gradsky (as a professional courtesy) merely has them thrown off the train. Conveniently, though they are in Siberia, there is an airport nearby, and they are able to board a crowded, ramshackle Aeroflot Antonov An-30 aircraft. Though the plane runs out of fuel and has to set down 300 miles from the train's next stop, Harry and Nick just barely manage to get back aboard the Bullet.

When they go to confront Gradsky, they receive several surprises. Natasha, whom they find in the colonel's compartment, turns out to be Gradsky's daughter. Then, they learn that Gradsky also works for Alex. Finally, Harry guesses that Alex is selling the Alorex to the North Koreans for heroin, a specialty of Craig's. Nick, who sincerely thinks that Alex is the man to lead Russia in the troubled times ahead, refuses to believe it. Harry talks Gradsky into dumping his half of the Alorex and replacing it with vodka and urine. But where is the other component? Then, Harry remembers that Louis' grandson had given him a seemingly innocent gift, a Matryoshka doll. Inside, he finds a vial.

Nevertheless, they have to pretend to deliver the Alorex. At the North Korean embassy, Palmer meets another old spy acquaintance, Kim Soo (Burt Kwouk). Kim Soo has orders to get rid of Harry because he knows too much. Nick rescues him by lying and saying Alex will deal with him later. Later, when Harry asks him why he did it, Nick tells him that he thinks Harry is his father. During the Cold War, the Soviets had attempted to suborn a British spy by having a woman agent seduce him. Harry denies being that man, but Nick doesn't believe him.

On the way back to St. Petersburg, Harry explains to Nick that Alex planted the specifications for Alorex in his passport (which was confiscated by Kim Soo), but Harry was not fooled. He burns the valuable but deadly information and tips off both a rival gangster and the police about the incoming heroin shipment. Complications arise when there is an attempt on Harry's life by men working for Kim Soo, which Craig surprisingly foils. The American, it turns out, is working for the U.S. Drug Enforcement Administration. Harry and his friends emerge relatively unscathed from the chaotic final shootout.

Cast
 Michael Caine as Harry Palmer
 Jason Connery as Nikolai Petrov
 Mia Sara as Natasha
 Michael Sarrazin as Craig Warner
 Michael Gambon as Alexei Alexeyevich
 Burt Kwouk as Kim Soo
 Sue Lloyd as Jean Courtney
 John Dunn-Hill as Louis
 Lev Prygunov as Colonel Gradsky
 Gregory Hlady as Police Captain
 Patrick Allen as Colonel Wilson
 Anatoli Davydov as Yuri Stephanovich
 Anatoly Kulbitsky as Prof. Kulbitsky

References

External links

1995 television films
1995 films
1990s spy films
British sequel films
British spy films
British television films
Films directed by George Mihalka
Films set in Saint Petersburg
Films set on the Trans-Siberian Railway
Films about the Drug Enforcement Administration
Films set in Siberia
1990s English-language films
1990s British films